Adelaide Harriet Boddam-Whetham (9 December 1860 – 20 September 1954) was a British archer.  She competed at the 1908 Summer Olympics in London. Boddam-Whetham competed at the 1908 Games in the only archery event open to women, the double National round.  She took 10th place in the event with 510 points.

References

External links
 
 
 Adelaide Boddam-Whetham's profile at Sports Reference.com

1860 births
1954 deaths
Archers at the 1908 Summer Olympics
Olympic archers of Great Britain
British female archers